Anjul Nigam (born December 15, 1965) is an Indian-born American actor, producer, and writer.

Early life and education 
Nigam was born in Kanpur, India. He is a graduate of Cheshire High School in Cheshire, Connecticut and the New York University Tisch School of the Arts.

Career 
He is known for his recurring role as "Dr. Raj, the Psychiatric doctor" on the ABC medical drama Grey's Anatomy, as a producer/writer/actor in the film Growing Up Smith and a producer of the film Louisiana Caviar. He appeared as one of the supporting leads in the CBS/Hallmark Hall of Fame movie Back When We Were Grownups along with Faye Dunaway, Peter Fonda, Jack Palance and Blythe Danner and directed by Ron Underwood. Nigam was one of four leads in 20th Century Fox's The First $20 Million Is Always the Hardest for director Mick Jackson and producers Harold Ramis and Trevor Albert. Nigam co-starred with Bill Murray and James Spader in the Universal/StudioCanal feature comedy Speaking of Sex for director John McNaughton. He also produced the 2019 film Crown Vic.

In television, Nigam was a regular in the role of "Nurse Manoj Nakshi" on the ABC medical drama MDs, and one of the leads in the ABC miniseries Tom Clancy's Netforce and in Showtime's Silver Strand. Nigam has had numerous guest starring roles in primetime television shows including Shark, Medium, Numb3rs, CSI: NY, CSI: Crime Scene Investigation, Huff, ER and NYPD Blue.

In theater, Nigam has appeared alongside fellow-NYU alumni Philip Seymour Hoffman in the controversial production of the Peter Sellars directed The Merchant of Venice at the Royal Shakespeare Company in London and The Goodman Theatre in Chicago.

In 2021, Nigam was named as a producer on Rust, a now suspended production due a firearms incident resulting in the death of a cinematographer Halyna Hutchins.

Filmography

Film

Television

References

External links

1965 births
Living people
Tisch School of the Arts alumni
Indian male television actors
Cheshire High School alumni